The following highways are numbered 490:

Canada
Manitoba Provincial Road 490
New Brunswick Route 490
Newfoundland and Labrador Route 490

Japan
 Japan National Route 490

United States
  Interstate 490 (disambiguation)
  Florida State Road 490
  County Road 490 (Citrus County, Florida)
  County Road 490A (Citrus County, Florida)
  Louisiana Highway 490
  Maryland Route 490
  Nevada State Route 490
  Puerto Rico Highway 490